Richard L. Guerrant (born July 21, 1943) is an American physician, medical school professor, and medical researcher, specializing in infectious diseases and tropical medicine.

Biography
Guerrant received his bachelor's degree from Davidson College and his M.D. from the University of Virginia School of Medicine. He completed his residency in internal medicine and infectious diseases at Harvard Medical Service at Boston City Hospital, where Maxwell Finland was his supervising attending physician and mentor.

After his cholera field research in Bangladesh, he returned to the University of Virginia School of Medicine. There he became a professor and the founding director of the Center for Global Health. He is the author or co-author of over 700 articles and the co-editor of several books.

In field studies, particularly in Brazil, he and his colleagues investigated the developmental problems of children who suffered from persistent diarrheal diseases in the critical first years of their lives. These investigations showed that such diseases stunted growth and harmed cognitive skills. The pathological cognitive effects, involving losses up to 10 IQ points, were linguistically not phonetic, but semantic, similar to the cognitive deficits in Alzheimer's patients. Guerrant and his team also found that APOE-ε4, the main risk allele in Alzheimer's disease, protects children against such cognitive losses due to diarrhea. This protection is a possible explanation for the spread of the allele APOE-ε4. This unexpected effect of the allele APOE-ε4 is analogous to the role of sickle cell anemia as a side effect of protection against malaria and the allele associated with cystic fibrosis as protection against cholera and other diarrheal diseases. He is continuing the research with a grant from the Bill and Melinda Gates Foundation.

The Infectious Diseases Society of America honored Guerrant with the Joseph E. Lectureship in 1993 and the Walter E. Stamm Mentor Award in 2009. In 1997 he was the president of the American Society of Tropical Medicine and Hygiene (ASTMH), was named Henderson Innovator of the Year at the University of Virginia, and received the Emilio Ribas Medal from the Sociedade Brasileira de Infectologia (Brazilian Society of Infectious Diseases). In 2002 he gave the Wesley Spink Memorial Lecture at the University of Minnesota's Department of Medicine. In 2003 Guerrant was elected a member of the National Academy of Medicine. He received in 2008 the Walter Reed Medal from the ASTMH and in 2014 the Maxwell Finland Award from the National Foundation for Infectious Diseases.

Richard L. Guerrant and his wife Nancy B. Guerrant established the Richard and Nancy Guerrant Center for Global Health Scholar Award at the University of Virginia. The couple have two sons and a daughter.

Selected publications

Articles

Books
 ; 2nd edition, 2006;

References

1943 births
Living people
American infectious disease physicians
American medical researchers
Davidson College alumni
University of Virginia School of Medicine alumni
University of Virginia School of Medicine faculty
Members of the National Academy of Medicine
Presidents of the American Society of Tropical Medicine and Hygiene